Santa Cecília do Sul is a municipality in the state of Rio Grande do Sul in the Southern Region of Brazil.

See also
List of municipalities in Rio Grande do Sul

References

Municipalities in Rio Grande do Sul